"Too Much to Think" is a song by American rock band 311. It is the first single from their twelfth studio album, Mosaic. It was released on March 11, 2017.

Music video
The music video for the track was directed by Rich Ragsdale and filmed at Vasquez Rocks, located outside out of Los Angeles. The clip sees a group of friends traveling around the area in their car, before getting off and exploring. The friends then lay down in a circle, while one of them delves into acts of shamanism, which includes placing healing crystals on top of each person. The friends then awake from their trances and go into an altered mind state. The main friend who was behind the shamanistic ritual is seen at the end of the video, achieving a higher level of plane as the video fades to white. Shots of the band are interposed throughout the video.

Charts

References

311 (band) songs
2017 singles
Song recordings produced by John Feldmann
Songs written by John Feldmann
Songs written by Nick Hexum
2017 songs